Jeanne d'Arc was an armoured cruiser built for the French Navy at the end of the 19th century, the sole ship of her class. Completed in 1903, she was initially assigned to the Northern Squadron, although she was transferred to the reserve fleet before the end of the year. The ship was recommissioned for a few months in mid-1905 and was transferred to the Mediterranean Fleet (Escadre de Méditerranée) in mid-1906 and served as a flagship for the next several years. Jeanne d'Arc was assigned to the reserve in mid-1908 and modified to serve as a training ship for naval cadets of the Naval Academy (École Navale). In 1912, she made the first of two lengthy training cruises.

A few days after she returned from her cruise, the ship was mobilised for service with the Northern Squadron as tensions rose before World War I began in August 1914. Jeanne d'Arc was tasked to patrol the English Channel in search of contraband and German blockade runners and continued to perform that mission until March 1915 when she was transferred to the Mediterranean. The ship was initially assigned to support French troops in the Dardanelles Campaign and then became flagship of the French ships patrolling the Levantine coast. In early 1916, Jeanne d'Arc began a lengthy refit that lasted until 1917 when she was assigned to the French West Indies. The ship was placed in reserve in 1918 and resumed her previous role as a training ship the next year. Jeanne d'Arc returned to reserve in 1928 and was struck from the Navy List in 1933 before being sold for scrap the following year.

Background and description

Jeanne d'Arc was originally conceived in the early 1890s as a large protected cruiser for overseas service, but the design was recast as an armoured cruiser by the naval architect Emile Bertin, director of the Navy's Technical Section (Section technique) in 1895. His design is regarded as unsuccessful with too light an armament for her size and failing to achieve her designed speed. The hull was subdivided by 15 watertight bulkheads that extended from her double bottom to the main armoured deck. Jeanne d'Arc had a crew of 651.

The ship had 3 four-cylinder vertical triple-expansion steam engines, each driving a single three-bladed propeller. In an effort to improve her speed, the propellers and the struts for her propeller shafts were replaced and her bilge keels were shortened, but the ship is not known to have exceeded her trials speed.

Jeanne d'Arcs main armament consisted of two 40-calibre  Modèle 1893 guns that were mounted in single-gun turrets, one each fore and aft of the superstructure. The ship's secondary armament comprised fourteen 45-calibre  Modèle 1893 guns in single mounts, protected by gun shields. Four of the guns on each broadside were positioned in hull sponsons and the remaining guns were on the sides of the superstructure. For close-range anti-torpedo boat defense, she carried sixteen quick-firing 40-calibre  Modèle 1885 Hotchkiss guns. Four of these were mounted in the fighting top on the military foremast and the others were positioned in the superstructure. Jeanne d'Arc was also armed with a pair of submerged  torpedo tubes.

Protection
Three additional strakes of 40-millimetre armour covered the sides of the bow up to the forecastle deck.

Above it was a thin deck of  armour on a  deck. The armour protecting the conning tower was 138 millimetres thick.

Construction and career

Jeanne d'Arc, named after the French warrior saint Joan of Arc, and nicknamed La Jeanne, was ordered on 28 December 1895 from the Arsenal de Toulon. While the Arsenal was not known for its speed of construction, the building of Jeanne d'Arc was even more prolonged than that shipyard's norm. Construction was almost at a standstill from September 1896 to June 1898, despite being laid down in October 1896, as the result of a dispute between the constructors and the naval administration and problems with her engines caused her to be launched on 8 June 1899 without her engines installed. In addition the feed pumps frequently failed because of the temperature of the feed water was too high due to the overheating of the condensers. Rectifying these problems took until March 1902, although another set of trials in April revealed problems with the piston rings in all three engines. She was finally commissioned on 10 March 1903, before her trials were concluded.

On 14 April, Jeanne d'Arc ferried Émile Loubet, the President of France, to French North Africa before departing for Marseilles on the 29th. Again manned for trials, the ship was assigned to the Northern Squadron, based at Brest, on 1 June and participated in exercises off the coast of Brittany over the next several months. Plagued by boiler problems, she was reduced to reserve on 14 September before being recommissioned on 8 October for trials. Apparently unsuccessful, Jeanne d'Arc was decommissioned for repairs on 15 November. The ship was recommissioned for trials in May 1905, but was placed in reserve on 6 August.

On 26 May 1906 Captain (Capitaine de vaisseau) Émile Guépratte assumed command of Jeanne d'Arc and she was assigned to the Mediterranean Fleet where she became flagship of the Light Squadron (Escadre Légere). After port visits in Tangiers, Morocco, and Gibraltar, she rendezvoused with the fleet on 12 July for the annual Grand Manoeuvres that lasted until the 28th. The ship participated in a fleet review by the President of France, Armand Fallières, at Marseilles on 16 September to commemorate the laying of the first stone of the Rove canal tunnel connecting Marseilles to the Rhône River. The following month, Jeanne d'Arc made a port visit to Bizerta, French Tunis. In 1907, the ship visited Morocco, Algeria and Cherbourg before getting her bottom cleaned at Brest in June and returning to Toulon on 20 July. After departing Gibraltar on 12 February 1908, she had a boiler explode, killing five and badly burning three crewmen. After arriving at Brest three days later, the ship was placed in reserve on 15 April to begin modifications to make her suitable for use as a training ship for naval cadets. Jeanne d'Arc was recommissioned on 20 May 1911 and was attached to the Third Division of the Reserve Squadron until 1 May 1912 when she was transferred to the Atlantic Schools Division. The ship began a lengthy cruise of the Atlantic, Mediterranean and Baltic Seas that lasted from 10 October 1912 to 29 July 1913. She visited the Indian Ocean via the Suez Canal on her next cruise from 10 October 1913 to 27 July 1914.

World War I

Jeanne d'Arc rejoined the Northern Squadron when mobilisation began on 1 August and was assigned to the 1st Division of the Second Light Squadron. After the German declaration of war on 3 August, she was assigned to patrol the western portion of the English Channel in search of blockade runners or ships carrying contraband. The ship remained there until reinforcements were needed in the Eastern Mediterranean after the beginning of the Dardanelles Campaign in February. Jeanne d'Arc was transferred to the Third Squadron in March 1915 where her first mission was to escort a troop convoy to Mudros. In late April, the French made several diversionary landings on the Anatolian side of the Dardanelles while the British made the primary landings on the Gallipoli Peninsula on the European side. The ship supported these landings and was hit twice by 150-millimetre shells on 26 April. One shell damaged a sponson, started a small fire and wounded some of her crew. The other shell failed to detonate and was tossed overboard.

Shortly afterwards, she became the flagship of the Third Squadron, hoisting the flags of Vice-Admirals (Vice-Amiral) Louis Dartige du Fournet, Dominique-Marie Gauchet, and Frederic Moreau until 30 March 1916. During this time, Jeanne d'Arc was based in Port Said, Egypt, enforcing the Allied blockade of the Turkish-owned Levantine and Aegean coasts. The ship supported the occupation of the islands of Ruad on 30–31 August 1915 and Castellorizo on 28 December. She also occasionally bombarded Turkish and German targets, including the German consulates in Alexandretta and Caiffa. Jeanne d'Arc was briefly refitted at Malta in October 1915 before returning to the Levant. The ship was withdrawn from the Levant at the end of March 1916 for a major refit in France. Upon its completion in January 1917, she was transferred to the 4th Light Squadron in the West Indies. Jeanne d'Arc returned to France in 1918 and was placed in reserve with a reduced crew.

Post-war activities
In 1919 the ship was refitted to allow her to resume her previous role as a training cruiser and was recommissioned in August 1919. Over the next decade, she made nine lengthy cruises, usually departing Brest in September or October and returning around the following July. During the last of these cruises in 1927–1928, Jeanne d'Arc was commanded by François Darlan. After returning to France that year, the ship was replaced by the newer armoured cruiser  and reduced to reserve. She was renamed Jeanne d'Arc II in 1930 to free her name for a purpose-built training cruiser then under construction and was stricken from the list on 15 February 1933. The ship was condemned on 21 March and sold for scrap on 9 July 1934.

References

Bibliography

 

 

Cruisers of the French Navy
Ships built in France
1899 ships
World War I cruisers of France
Ships with du Temple boilers